The Ballet Class (French: La Classe de danse) is a painting by Edgar Degas, which was painted between 1871 and 1874. It is in the collection of the Musée d'Orsay, Paris, France. It was commissioned by Jean-Baptiste Faure. Degas temporarily abandoned work on this painting, and delivered a work of a similar name to Faure.

The painting depicts dancers at the end of a lesson under ballet master Jules Perrot. Perrot and Degas were friends, and Degas painted the dance class in the Paris Opera a year after it burnt down.

See also
 The Dance Class (Degas, Metropolitan Museum of Art)

References

Paintings by Edgar Degas
Dance in art
1870s paintings